The Phalanx CIWS (often spoken as "sea-wiz") is a gun-based close-in weapon system to defend military watercraft automatically against incoming threats such as aircraft, missiles, and small boats. It was designed and manufactured by the General Dynamics Corporation, Pomona Division, later a part of Raytheon. Consisting of a radar-guided  Vulcan cannon mounted on a swiveling base, the Phalanx has been used by the United States Navy and the naval forces of 15 other countries. Other users include the British Royal Navy, the Royal Australian Navy, the Royal New Zealand Navy, the Royal Canadian Navy and the US Coast Guard (aboard its - and s).
 
A land variant, the LPWS (Land Phalanx Weapon System), part of the C-RAM system, was developed. It was deployed to counter rocket, artillery and mortar attacks during the 2021 US withdrawal from Afghanistan. The U.S. Navy also fields the SeaRAM system, which pairs the RIM-116 Rolling Airframe Missile with sensors based on the Phalanx.

Because of their distinctive barrel-shaped radome and their automated nature of operation, Phalanx CIWS units are sometimes nicknamed "R2-D2" after the droid from the Star Wars films.

History
The Phalanx Close-In Weapons System (CIWS) was developed as the last line of automated weapons defense (terminal defense or point defense) against all incoming threats, including antiship missiles (AShMs or ASMs), aircraft including high-g and maneuvering sea-skimmers, and small boats.

The first prototype system was offered to the U.S. Navy for evaluation on the destroyer leader  in 1973 and it was determined that further work was required to improve performance and reliability. Subsequently, the Phalanx Operational Suitability Model successfully completed its Operational Test and Evaluation (OT&E) on board the destroyer  in 1977. The model exceeded operational maintenance, reliability, and availability specifications. Another evaluation successfully followed, and the weapon system was approved for production in 1978. Phalanx production started with orders for 23 USN and 14 foreign military systems. The first ship fully fitted out was the aircraft carrier  in 1980. The Navy began placing CIWS systems on non-combatant vessels in 1984.

Design
The basis of the system is the 20 mm M61 Vulcan Gatling gun autocannon, used by the United States military on various tactical aircraft since 1959, linked to a Ku band fire control radar system for acquiring and tracking targets. This proven system was combined with a purpose-made mounting, capable of fast elevation and traverse speeds, to track incoming targets. An entirely self-contained unit, the mounting houses the gun, an automated fire-control system and all other major components, enabling it to automatically search for, detect, track, engage, and confirm kills using its computer-controlled radar system. Owing to this self-contained nature, Phalanx is ideal for support ships, which lack integrated targeting systems and generally have limited sensors.

Upgrades
Due to the evolution of threats and computer technology, the Phalanx system has been developed through several configurations. The basic (original) style is the Block 0, equipped with first-generation, solid-state electronics and with marginal capability against surface targets. The Block 1 (1988) upgrade offered various improvements in radar, ammunition, computing power, rate of fire, and an increase in maximum engagement elevation to +70 degrees. These improvements were intended to increase the system's capability against emerging Russian supersonic anti-ship missiles. Block 1A introduced a new computer system to counter more maneuverable targets. The Block 1B PSuM (Phalanx Surface Mode, 1999) adds a forward-looking infrared (FLIR) sensor to make the weapon effective against surface targets. This addition was developed to provide ship defense against small vessel threats and other "floaters" in littoral waters and to improve the weapon's performance against slower low-flying aircraft. The FLIR's capability is also of use against low-observability missiles and can be linked with the RIM-116 Rolling Airframe Missile (RAM) system to increase RAM engagement range and accuracy. The Block 1B also allows for an operator to visually identify and target threats.

Since the end of FY 2015, the US Navy has upgraded all Phalanx systems to the Block 1B variant. In addition to the FLIR sensor, the Block 1B incorporates an automatic acquisition video tracker, optimized gun barrels (OGB), and Enhanced Lethality Cartridges (ELC) for additional capabilities against asymmetric threats such as small maneuvering surface craft, slow-flying fixed and rotary-winged aircraft, and unmanned aerial vehicles. The FLIR sensor improves performance against anti-ship cruise missiles, while the OGB and ELC provide tighter dispersion and increased "first-hit" range; the Mk 244 ELC is specifically designed to penetrate anti-ship missiles with a 48 percent heavier tungsten penetrator round and an aluminum nose piece. Another system upgrade is the Phalanx 1B Baseline 2 radar to improve detection performance, increase reliability, and reduce maintenance. It also has a surface mode to track, detect, and destroy threats closer to the water's surface, increasing the ability to defend against fast-attack boats and low-flying missiles. As of 2019, the Baseline 2 radar upgrade has been installed on all U.S. Navy Phalanx system-equipped vessels. The Block 1B is also used by other navies, such as Canada, Portugal, Japan, Egypt, Bahrain, and the UK.

In April 2017, Raytheon tested a new electric gun for the Phalanx allowing the system to fire at varying rates to conserve ammunition. The new design replaces the pneumatic motor, compressor, and storage tanks, reducing system weight by  while increasing reliability and reducing operating costs.

Operation
The CIWS is designed to be the last line of defense against anti-ship missiles. The gun mount moves at a very high speed and with great precision. The system takes minimal inputs from the ship, making it capable of functioning despite potential damage to the ship. 

The only inputs required for operation are 440V AC three-phase electric power at 60Hz and water (for electronics cooling). For full operation, including some nonessential functions, it also has inputs for ship's true compass heading and 115V AC for the WinPASS subsystem. WinPASS (Windows-based Parameter Analysis and Storage Subsystem) is a secondary computer built into the local control station that allows technicians to perform various tests on system hardware and software for maintenance and troubleshooting purposes. It also stores data from any engagements the system conducts so that it can later be analyzed.

Radar subsystems
The CIWS has two antennas that work together to engage targets. The first antenna, for searching, is located inside the radome on the weapon control group (top of the white-painted portion). The search subsystem provides bearing, range, velocity, heading, and altitude information of potential targets to the CIWS computer. This information is analyzed to determine whether the detected object should be engaged by the CIWS system. Once the computer identifies a valid target (see details below), the mount moves to face the target and then hands the target over to the tracking antenna at around 8 km. The track antenna is extremely precise, but views a much smaller area. The tracking subsystem observes the target until the computer determines that the probability of a successful hit is maximized and then, depending on the operator conditions, the system either fires automatically at around 2 km or recommends fire to the operator. While firing 75 rounds per second, the system tracks outgoing rounds and 'walks' them onto the target.

Gun and ammunition handling system
The Block 0 CIWS mounts (hydraulic driven) fired at a rate of 3,000 rounds per minute and held 989 rounds in the magazine drum. The Block 1 CIWS mounts (hydraulic) also fired at 3,000 rounds per minute with an extended magazine drum holding 1,550 rounds. The Block 1A and newer (pneumatic driven) CIWS mounts fire at a rate of 4,500 rounds per minute with a 1,550-round magazine. The rounds are armor-piercing tungsten penetrator rounds or depleted uranium with discardable sabots. The Phalanx CIWS 20–mm rounds are designed to destroy a missile's airframe and make it non aerodynamic, thus keeping shrapnel from the exploding projectile to a minimum, effectively keeping secondary damage to a minimum. The ammunition handling system has two conveyor belt systems. The first takes the rounds out of the magazine drum to the gun; the second takes empty shells or unfired rounds to the opposite end of the drum.

The 20–mm APDS rounds consist of a  penetrator encased in a plastic sabot and a lightweight metal pusher. Shells fired by the Phalanx cost around $30 each and the gun typically fires 100 or more when engaging a target.

CIWS contact target identification
The CIWS does not recognize identification friend or foe, also known as IFF. The CIWS only has the data it collects in real time from the radars to decide if the target is a threat and to engage it. A contact must meet multiple criteria for the CIWS to consider it a target.  These criteria include:

 Is the range of the target increasing or decreasing in relation to the ship? The CIWS search radar sees contacts that are out-bound and discards them. The CIWS engages a target only if it is approaching the ship.
 Is the contact capable of maneuvering to hit the ship? If a contact is not heading directly at the ship, the CIWS looks at its heading in relation to the ship and its velocity. It then decides if the contact can still perform a maneuver to hit the ship.
 Is the contact traveling between the minimum and maximum velocities? The CIWS has the ability to engage targets that travel in a wide range of speeds; however, it is not an infinitely wide range. The system has a target maximum-velocity limit. If a target exceeds this velocity, the CIWS does not engage it. It also has a target minimum-velocity limit, and does not engage any contact below that velocity. The operator can adjust the minimum and maximum limits within the limits of the system.

There are many other subsystems that together ensure proper operation, such as environmental control, transmitter, mount movement control, power control and distribution, and so on. It takes six to eight months to train a technician to maintain, operate, and repair the CIWS.

Incidents

Drone exercise accidents
On 10 February 1983,  was conducting a live-fire exercise off the East Coast of the United States using the Phalanx against a target drone. Although the drone was successfully engaged at close range, the target debris bounced off the sea surface and struck the ship. This caused significant damage and fire from the drone's residual fuel, which also killed a civilian instructor aboard this ship.

On 13 October 1989,  was conducting a live-fire exercise off the East Coast of the United States using the Phalanx against a target drone. The drone was successfully engaged, but as the drone fell to the sea, the CIWS re-engaged it as a continued threat to El Paso.

Iran–Iraq War

On 17 May 1987, during the Iran–Iraq War, an Iraqi  modified Falcon 50 business jet,  fired two Exocet missiles at the American frigate .

Both missiles struck the port side of the ship near the bridge. The Phalanx CIWS remained in standby mode and the Mark 36 SRBOC countermeasures were not armed. 37 United States Navy personnel were killed and 21 wounded.

Iraqi missile attack in 1991 Gulf War 
On 25 February 1991, during the first Gulf War, the Phalanx-equipped frigate  was a few miles from the U.S. Navy battleship  and the Royal Navy destroyer . An Iraqi missile battery fired two Silkworm missiles (often referred to as the Seersucker), at which time Missouri fired its SRBOC chaff countermeasures. The Phalanx system on Jarrett, operating in its automatic target-acquisition mode, fixed on Missouris chaff, releasing a burst of rounds. There were no injuries on Missouri and the Iraqi missiles were destroyed by Sea Dart missiles fired by Gloucester.

Accidental downing of US aircraft by the Japanese destroyer Yūgiri
The   locked onto the Intruder instead of the target or tracked up the tow cable after acquiring the towed-target. Both the pilot and bombardier/navigator ejected safely. A post-accident investigation concluded that Yūgiris gunnery officer gave the order to fire before the A-6 was out of the CIWS engagement envelope.

Centurion C-RAM

Seeking a solution to continual rocket and mortar attacks on bases in Iraq, the U.S. Army requested a quick-to-field antiprojectile system in May 2004, as part of its Counter-Rocket, Artillery, Mortar initiative. The end result of this program was the "Centurion". For all intents and purposes a terrestrial version of the Navy's CIWS, the Centurion was rapidly developed, with a proof-of-concept test in November that same year. Deployment to Iraq began in 2005, where it was set up to protect forward operating bases and other high-value sites in and around the capital, Baghdad. Israel purchased a single system for testing purposes, and was reported to have considered buying the system to counter rocket attacks and defend point military installations. However, the swift and effective development and performance of Israel's indigenous Iron dome system has ruled out any purchase or deployment of Centurion.
Each system consists of a modified Phalanx 1B CIWS, powered by an attached generator and mounted on a trailer for mobility. Including the same 20 mm M61A1 Gatling gun, the unit is likewise capable of firing 4,500 20–mm rounds per minute. In 2008, there were more than 20 CIWS systems protecting bases in the U.S. Central Command area of operations. A Raytheon spokesman told the Navy Times that 105 attacks were defeated by the systems, most of them involving mortars. Based on the success of Centurion, 23 additional systems were ordered in September 2008.

Like the naval (1B) version, Centurion uses Ku-band radar and FLIR to detect and track incoming projectiles, and is also capable of engaging surface targets, with the system able to reach a minus-25-degree elevation. The Centurion is reportedly capable of defending a  area. One major difference between the land- and sea-based variants is the choice of ammunition. Whereas naval Phalanx systems fire tungsten armor-piercing rounds, the C-RAM uses the 20–mm HEIT-SD (High-Explosive Incendiary Tracer, Self-Destruct) ammunition, originally developed for the M163 Vulcan Air Defense System. These rounds explode on impact with the target, or on tracer burnout, thereby greatly reducing the risk of collateral damage from rounds that fail to hit their target.

Operators

Current operators

 
 

 

 
 Canadian Surface Combatant
 Protecteur-class auxiliary vessel

 

 
 
 

 

 
 
 Ambassador MK III missile boat

 

 
 

 
 
 
 
 
 
 
 
 Akizuki-class destroyer
 
 
 
 
 

 
 

 
HMNZS Aotearoa

 
 
 PNS Moawin (A39)
 Type 905 replenishment tanker

 

 

 
 

 
 
 
 

 Bhumibol Adulyadej-class frigate

 
 TCG Anadolu LHD
 Bayraktar-class tank landing ship
 

 (13 sets MK15 Phalanx Block 1B Baseline 2, 8 set is for upgrading the current Block 0 to MK15 Phalanx Block 1B Baseline 2, total cost: 0.416B with 260K MK 244 MOD 0 armor piercing bullet, Baseline2 is the newest model in Block 1B on 11/2016)
 
 
 
 
 
 
 
 

 
 
 
 Type 45 destroyer
 Type 26 frigate

Former

 
 

 
 
  (Gulf War upgrades)

 
 
 

 KD Sri Inderapura

 

 

 
 

 
 Type 42 destroyer
 HMS Ocean (L12)

Former Operators 

 Hamid Karzai International Airport in the Afghan capital Kabul – Decommissioned following 2021 evacuation from Afghanistan

Specifications (Block 1A/B)

Gun: 1× 20–mm M61A2 Vulcan 6-barreled Gatling cannon
Height: 
Weight: , later models 
Elevation −25° to +85°
Muzzle velocity: 
Rate of fire: 4,500 rounds/minute
Maximum burst size: 1000 rounds
Ammunition capacity: 1,550 rounds
Radar: Ku band
Cost: $12 Million
Target Mach 2.

Similar systems
SeaRAM, American system based on the RIM-116 Rolling Airframe Missile with a sensor system based on the Phalanx
AK-630, Russian CIWS
Kashtan CIWS, Russian Gun-Missile CIWS 
Goalkeeper CIWS, Dutch CIWS based on the GAU-8 Avenger autocannon
Aselsan GOKDENIZ, Turkish CIWS
Meroka CIWS, Spanish navy
Barak 1, Israel. missile-based
Type 730 CIWS, Chinese CIWS

References

External links 

Official United States Navy Warfighters Encyclopedia CIWS page
GlobalSecurity.org fact file
Raytheon Company Phalanx CIWS product page

Naval anti-aircraft guns
Rotary cannon
Multi-barrel machine guns
Close-in weapon systems
Raytheon Company products
Anti-aircraft guns of the United States
Naval guns of the United States
Military robots
20x102mm
Naval weapons of Australia
Multiple-barrel firearms
Military equipment introduced in the 1980s
Cold War weapons of the United States

sv:M61 Vulcan#Phalanx CIWS